Gour Naskar is an Indian professional footballer who plays as a defender for United in the I-League.

Career
Naskar has played for George Telegraph S.C. and Southern Samity in the Calcutta Football League. He also played for ONGC F.C. in the I-League 2nd Division and the I-League.

References

Living people

Indian footballers
ONGC FC players
United SC players
Association football defenders
Footballers from West Bengal
I-League players
Place of birth missing (living people)
Year of birth missing (living people)